Golden Era is the ninth solo studio album by American hip hop musician Del the Funky Homosapien. It was released by The Council in 2011. The CD edition comes with two bonus discs: Automatik Statik and Funk Man. It peaked at number 28 on the Billboard Heatseekers Albums chart, as well as number 65 on the Top R&B/Hip-Hop Albums chart.

Critical reception
At Metacritic, which assigns a weighted average score out of 100 to reviews from mainstream critics, the album received an average score of 76% based on 8 reviews, indicating "generally favorable reviews".

Kiel Hauck of PopMatters gave the album 6 stars out of 10, saying, "Golden Era, like so much of Del's previous work, captures the feeling of a simpler yet better time in hip-hop, before the glitz and glamour, the high dollar music videos, and the painful overuse of that detestable thing called Auto-Tune." He added: "Regardless of if you were hoping for more from Del in his latest offering, Golden Era is a good summer album and a reminder of all of the things you loved about hip-hop growing up."

Track listing

Charts

References

External links
 

2011 albums
Del the Funky Homosapien albums